The tiger (Panthera tigris) is the largest cat species.

Tiger or tigers may also refer to:

Other animals
 Smilodon, commonly known as the saber-tooth tiger, an extinct genus
 Thylacine, commonly known as the Tasmanian tiger, an extinct marsupial 
 Danaini, sometimes known as tiger butterflies
 Arctiinae (moth), commonly known as tiger moths

Arts, entertainment and media

Characters
 Tiger (comics), the name of several characters
 Tiger (dog), animal actor in the TV series The Brady Bunch and the film A Boy and His Dog
 Tiger Jackson, from the video game series Tekken
 Tiger Ow, in the Jackie Chan film Project A Part II
 Satoru Tojo or Tiger, from the Kamen Rider Ryuki Japanese TV series
 Tiger, from An American Tail films
 Tiger, from Ibn-e-Safi's Imran series
 Tiger, played by Salman Khan in the films Tiger Zinda Hai (2017) and Ek Tha Tiger (2012)
 Tiger Gleeson, from Australian series Round the Twist
 Tiger Tanaka, an ally of James Bond in the film You Only Live Twice
 The Tiger, a villain in Meet the Tiger by Leslie Charteris
 The Tigers, a group of bullies from the Encyclopedia Brown books

Films
 The Tiger (1978 film), a Yugoslav film
 Tiger (1979 film), a Telugu film
 The Tigers (film), a 1991 Hong Kong action film
 Tiger, a 1997 film by Serge Rodnunsky
 Tiger (2007 film), a Bengali film
 Tigers (2014 film), an Indian film
 Tiger (2015 film), a 2015 Telugu film
 The Tiger: An Old Hunter's Tale, 2015 South Korean film
 Tiger (2017 film), 2017 Indian Kannada film
 Tiger (2018 film), an American film starring Mickey Rourke
 Tigers (2020 film), a Swedish-Italian-Danish sports drama film

Music
 The Tigers (opera), by Havergal Brian

Bands
 Tiger (1970s band), formerly Crushed Butler, 1970s proto-punk band
 Tiger (band), late-1990s indie rock band
 The Tigers (Japanese band), 1960s Japanese rock band
 The Tigers (New Zealand band), 1980s New Zealand band
 Tiger Band (disambiguation), several university marching bands

Albums
 Tiger (Frank Buck album), 1950 children's record
 Tiger (Superette album), 1996
 Tigers (album), by The Dance Party, 2009
 ส (Tiger), by Thaiboy Digital, 2014

Songs
 "Tiger" (ABBA song), 1976
 "Tiger" (Fabian song), 1959
 "Tiger" (Steve Angello song), 2015
 "Tiger", a song by Mike McGear from the 1972 album Woman
 "Tiger", a song by Neil Cicierega from the album Mouth Moods

In print
 Tiger (comic strip) (1965–2003), an American comic 
 Tiger (Fleetway) (1954–1985), a British comic
 The Tiger, a 2010 book by John Vaillant

Publications
 Tiger (magazine) (1956–1990s), an American men's magazine
 The Tiger (political magazine), a Chinese publication
 The Tiger (newspaper), an American student newspaper

Other uses in arts, entertainment and media
 Tiger (franchise), an Indian media franchise of two Bollywood films and a graphic novel series
 Tiger (guitar), used by Jerry Garcia
 Tiger (TV series), a 1990s Indian detective soap opera
 Tiger (video game) or Destiny, a multiplayer first-person shooter video game released in 2014

Business
 Tiger Aircraft, an American aircraft manufacturer 
 Tiger Airways, or Tigerair, a regional airline based in Singapore
 Tiger Aspect Productions, also Tiger Television, a British TV production company
 Tiger Beer, a brand of Heineken Asia Pacific
 Tiger Brands, a South African packaged goods company
 Tiger Corporation, a Japanese small appliance maker
 Tiger Electronics, an American toy manufacturer
 Tiger Inn, a Princeton University club
 Tiger Line, a British local bus service 
 Tiger Resources, an Australia-based mining company
 Tiger Telematics, a Swedish electronics company
 Flying Tiger Copenhagen, formerly Tiger, a Danish variety store 
 Tigers, part of Cub Scouting

Military
 Operation Tiger (disambiguation)

Aircraft
 Eurocopter Tiger, a European attack helicopter
 Grumman F-11 Tiger, a U.S. Navy fighter of the 1950s and 1960s
 Northrop F-5 Tiger II, an American supersonic light fighter

Land vehicles
 Tiger I, a German World War II heavy tank
 Tiger II, the successor of the Tiger I
 VK 45.01 (P), also informally known as the Tiger (P) or Porsche Tiger, the losing design for the Tiger I
 Geschützwagen Tiger, a German self-propelled gun carrier of World War II that never saw service

Ships
 
 Tiger-class cruiser, the last cruiser class of the Royal Navy
 Tiger-class fast attack craft, a post-World War II class of Bundesmarine (German Federal Navy) fast attack craft
 , a Type 24 torpedo boat launched in 1928 and sunk in a collision in 1939
 , the Norwegian destroyer HNoMS Tor captured by Germany in 1940 and renamed Tiger
 SMS Tiger (1887), a torpedo ram cruiser of the Austro-Hungarian Navy

Units
 Tiger Division (disambiguation)
 Tiger Force (disambiguation)
 Tigers Militia, the military wing of the National Liberal Party during the Lebanese Civil War
 Tiger Squad, a Saudi Arabian death squad implicated consisting of police and military personnel
 Flying Tigers, the 1st American Volunteer Group of the Chinese Air Force
 Tigers, nickname of 3rd Division
 Tigers, nickname of the 152d Fighter Squadron, Arizona Air National Guard
 Tigers, nickname of the Royal Leicestershire Regiment, a British Army infantry regiment
 Tigers, nickname of the Serb Volunteer Guard, a paramilitary organisation 
 Tiger Forces, a Syrian Arab Army special forces unit
 The Tigers, aerobatic display team of No. 74 Squadron RAF
 Liberation Tigers of Tamil Eelam, or Tamil Tigers, in Sri Lanka

People
 Tiger (surname), a list of people with the surname
 Tiger (nickname), a list of people
 Tiger Palpatja (c. 1920–2012), Australian Aboriginal artist
 Tiger Varadachariar (1876–1950), Carnatic music vocalist
 Big Tiger, Principal Chief of the council of a dissident group of Cherokee, 1824–1828
 Tiger (musician), Jamaican dancehall musician Norman Washington Jackson (born 1960)
 Tiger (wrestler), a ring name of a Mexican professional wrestler (born 1987)
 Tiger Ali Singh and Tiger Jeet Singh, Jr., ring names of Indo-Canadian professional wrestler Gurjit Singh Hans (born 1971)
 Tiger Jeet Singh (born 1944), ring name of an Indo-Canadian wrestler and father of Tiger Ali Singh

Places
 Tiger, Arizona, U.S., a ghost town
 Tiger, Colorado, U.S., a ghost town
 Tiger, Georgia, U.S., a town
 Tiger, Washington, U.S., an unincorporated community
 Tiger Cave (disambiguation)
 Tiger Creek (disambiguation)
 Tiger Lake (disambiguation)
 Tiger Mountain (disambiguation)

Science, technology and mathematics
 Mac OS X Tiger, an Apple operating system 
 Tiger (hash function), in cryptography
 Tiger (security software), a Unix security tool
 Tiger, a 2004 version of the Java Platform, Standard Edition
 Tiger, a line of automatic test equipment produced by Teradyne

Sports
 Tigers (sports teams), various sports teams
 Tiger Cup, an association football tournament now known as the AFF Championship
 The Tiger (mascot), of the athletic teams of Clemson University, South Carolina, U.S.

Transportation

Land
 Leyland Tiger (front-engined), a bus and coach chassis (1927–1968)
 Leyland Tiger, a bus and coach chassis (1981–1992)
 Sunbeam Tiger, a high-performance car (1964–1967)
 Sunbeam Tiger (1925), a racing car
 Tiger (automobile), a 1914 cycle-car built in Detroit, Michigan
 Tiger Truck, a Chinese light utility truck
 Triumph Tiger, various motorcycles 
 Tiger, a South Devon Railway Eagle class locomotive 
 Tiger, a GWR Firefly Class locomotive

Sea
 List of ships named Tiger
 Tiger 25, a British sailboat design

Air
 Siddeley Tiger, an unsuccessful post-First World War British aero engine
 Tiger, two models of the Grumman American AA-5 light aircraft 
 Toyota Tiger, version of sixth generation Toyota Hilux light commercial vehicles

Other uses
 Tiger (zodiac), one of the animals in the Chinese zodiac
 Transportation Investment Generating Economic Recovery (TIGER), a federal stimulus program in the American Recovery and Reinvestment Act of 2009
 Topologically Integrated Geographic Encoding and Referencing (TIGER), a mapping format used by the U.S. Census Bureau
 NATO Tiger Association, whose goal is to promote solidarity between NATO air forces
 Tiger (organisation), a Russian-based opposition pressure group
 The Tigers, 1966 toys by Topper Toys

See also

 
 
 Tiger economy
 Tony the Tiger (disambiguation)
 Tiger Tiger (disambiguation)
 Big Tiger and Little Tiger, non-standard poker hands
 Taiga (disambiguation)
 Tiga (disambiguation)
 Tigar (disambiguation)
 Tigger, a character from Winnie-the-Pooh
 Tigr (Russian military vehicle), a Russian military vehicle
 Tigra (disambiguation)
 Tigre (disambiguation)
 Tyger (disambiguation)